L'album de Noël is a 2000 English language Christmas album by Canadian singer Roch Voisine. He simultaneously released a French language Christmas album entitled L'album de Noël.

Track listing
Silent Night 
White Christmas 
Winter Wonderland 
Joy To The World 
Sleigh Ride 
Little Drummer Boy 
I'll Be Home For Christmas 
O Christmas Tree 
Happy Christmas 
The Christmas Song 
What Child Is This 
Silver Bells 
Blue Christmas 
Christmas Is Calling 
O Holy Night

External links
Roch Voisine Official site album page

2000 Christmas albums
Roch Voisine albums
Christmas albums by Canadian artists
Pop Christmas albums